See Tira for other sites with similar names. 

al-Tira (also called Tirat al-Lawz or "Tira of the almonds" to distinguish it from other al-Tiras) was a Palestinian town located 7 kilometres south of Haifa.

It was made up of five khirbets, including Khirbat al-Dayr where lie the ruins of St. Brocardus monastery and a cave complex with vaulted tunnels.

The town was replaced by the Israeli town of Tirat Carmel in 1949.

History
Some scholars have suggested that the name Tireh reflects the town's history as the original location of Ancient Tyre.

The Crusaders called al-Tira, St. Yohan de Tire, and in the thirteenth century the village contained a Greek Orthodox abbey of St. John the Baptist.  In 1283 it was mentioned as part of the domain of the Crusaders, according to  the hudna between the Crusaders  and the Mamluk sultan  Qalawun.

Ottoman era
In 987 H. (1579 CE) it is recorded that Assaf, the sanjaqbey of al-Lajjun, built a mosque in the village.

In 1596, al-Tira was a village with a population of 52 Muslim households, an estimated 286 persons, under the administrative jurisdiction of the nahiya ("subdistrict") of Shafa, part of Sanjak Lajjun of the Ottoman Empire. Villagers paid a fixed tax-rate of 25%  to the authorities for the crops that they cultivated, which included wheat, goats, beehives, and vineyards; a total of 26,000 Akçe.

In 1799, it appeared  under the name of El Koneiceh  (= Kh. el Keniseh) on the map that Pierre Jacotin compiled that year, though it was misplaced.
 
Victor Guérin visited in 1870,  “I first examined a small mosque, which appears to have been formerly a Christian church. Aligned from west to east it has only a single nave and is terminated towards the east by an apse. One enters through a rectangular door crowned by a fine monolithic lintel. This church, which has been constructed with very regular ashlars, is covered by slightly pointed vaults, above which there is a flat terrace roof.”

After the heavy conscription imposed by the Ottomans in 1872, there was a decline in the village's prosperity, but it subsequently recovered.

A population list from about 1887 showed that Tireh had about 2,555 inhabitants; all Muslims.

British Mandate era
In the 1922 census of Palestine, conducted by the  British Mandate authorities,  Tireh had a population of 2,346; 2,336 Palestinian Muslims, 1 Jew and 9 Christians,  where the Christians were 1 Roman Catholic and 8 Orthodox.  The population had increased in the 1931 census  to 3,191 people; 3,173 Muslims, 17 Christians, 1 Druze, in a total of  624 houses.

In 1943, al-Tira produced more olives and oil than any other village in the Haifa District. The abundance of almond trees in al-Tira gave rise to the village's nickname, Tirat al-Lawz ("Tira of the almonds"). By 1945, its 5,240 Muslims and 30 Christians shared two elementary schools, one for boys, the other for girls. Its economy was based on the cultivation of grain, vegetables and fruit, watered with the natural springs of the village.

By the 1945 statistics, al Tira had a population of 5,270;  30 Christians and 5,240 Muslims, with a total land area of 45,262 dunams.  Of this, Palestinians used  16,219 for cereals; 3,543 dunums were irrigated or used for orchards,  while a total of 901  dunams were built-up (urban) land.

1948 depopulation and later
Tira was lightly attacked by the Haganah on the night of 21–22 April 1948 "to prevent assistance being given to the Haifa Palestinians ", according to a British report. This caused an evacuation of some women  and children of the village, according to Haganah military sources. At dawn on April 25, the Haganah mortared Tira, and in the early hours of 26 April it launched a strong attack on the village, with the apparent aim of conquest, using mortars and machine guns. An infantry company reached the eastern outskirts of the village and conquered positions on the Carmel slopes overlooking the village, but was apparently halted by fire from British units. The village's non-combat population was then evacuated by the British, leaving several hundred armed men to defend it. It fell to Israeli forces in July.

Following the war, the area was incorporated into the State of Israel. Tira was first settled with Jewish immigrants in February 1949; by April it had a population of 2,000. Many of Tira's refugees fled to Jordan, mostly to Irbid.

The Palestinian historian Walid Khalidi described the village remains in 1992, noting that part of the village site had been incorporated into Tirat Carmel: "Some of the houses, such as one belonging to 'Irsan al-Dhib, remain standing. The cemetery is unkempt and there are several broken gravestones. The remains of two shrines are visible and the school is used by Israeli students, both Palestinians and Jewish. There are forests and some residential houses in the mountainous part of the surrounding land."

Al-Tira had two mosques, named the Old and the New. The Old mosque was originally a church, and was already out of use by 1932. The New mosque appears to be still standing, but now converted into a synagogue. The age of the New Mosque is not agreed upon; Pringle  states that it is the mosque built by Assaf in 1579 C.E. However, Petersen, who inspected it in 1994, reports that this is incorrect, and that an inscription set in an arched recess by the door to what was the entrance to the prayer hall records, in provincial nasskhi script, the construction of the mosque to Ishaq ibn Amir in 687 H. (1288-1289 CE).

By 2011, four books about the Palestinian village history had been published.

References

Bibliography

  

  
 
 

 
  

Heyd, Uriel (1960): Ottoman Documents on Palestine, 1552-1615, Oxford University Press, Oxford. Cited in Petersen (2001)

 
 

Mülinen,  Eberhard Friedrich von, 1908, Beiträge zur Kenntnis des Karmels "Separateabdruck aus der Zeitschrift des Deutschen Palëstina-Vereins Band XXX (1907) Seite 117-207 und Band XXXI (1908) Seite 1-258." ("Et-Tire": p. 142 ff. )
 
  
   Also cited in Petersen (2001)
 (p. 432)

External links
Welcome to al-Tira
al-Tira (Haifa),  Zochrot
Survey of Western Palestine, Map 5:   IAA, Wikimedia commons
al-Tira from the Khalil Sakakini Cultural Center
Rami Nashashibi (1996):     al-Tira, Center for Research and Documentation of Palestinian Society.

Arab villages depopulated prior to the 1948 Arab–Israeli War
District of Haifa